The men's 4×100 metre medley relay at the 2009 World Aquatics Championships took place on 2 August 2009 at the Foro Italico in Rome, Italy.

Records
Prior to this competition, the existing world and competition records were as follows:

The following records were established during the competition:

Results

Heats

Final

External links
Heats Results
Final Results

Medley relay Men 4x100